"If You Should Ever Be Lonely" is a song by American singer Val Young, it was released in 1985 as the first single from her album Seduction issued by label Motown. The single peaked at number twenty-one on the U.S. Billboard R&B Songs chart.  "If You Should Ever Be Lonely" was more successful on the US Dance Songs chart, hitting number-one for three weeks.

Covers
Real McCoy covered the song for their 1995 album Another Night.

American pop/R&B singer-songwriter and producer Mariah Carey's 1999 US Billboard Hot 100 number one song "Heartbreaker" interpolates Young's composition in its Junior Vasquez club mixes.

Track listings and formats
US and UK 7" Vinyl single
A. "If You Should Ever Be Lonely" (Remix) – 4:00
B. "If You Should Ever Be Lonely" (Instrumental) – 3:54

US and UK 12" Vinyl single
A1. "If You Should Ever Be Lonely" (Club Mix) – 6:32
A2. "If You Should Ever Be Lonely" (Club Mix Radio Edit) – 4:15
B.  "If You Should Ever Be Lonely" (Street Mix) – 7:23

US 7" Vinyl promo single
A. "If You Should Ever Be Lonely" (Radio Edit) – 3:54

Charts

References

1985 singles
1985 songs